John Murray Anderson (born March 28, 1957) is a Canadian former ice hockey right winger. He was the head coach of the Chicago Wolves of the International Hockey League (IHL) and American Hockey League (AHL) from 1997 to 2008 and again from 2013 to 2016. In the National Hockey League (NHL), he is a former head coach of the Atlanta Thrashers and assistant coach of the Phoenix Coyotes and Minnesota Wild. He played 12 seasons in the NHL for the Toronto Maple Leafs, Quebec Nordiques, and Hartford Whalers.

Playing career
As a youth, Anderson played in the 1969 Quebec International Pee-Wee Hockey Tournament with a minor ice hockey team from Wexford, Toronto. Anderson was the captain of his junior team, the Toronto Marlboros.

Anderson was drafted in the first round, 11th overall by the Toronto Maple Leafs in the 1977 NHL Entry Draft. He played 814 career NHL games, scoring 282 goals and 349 assists for 631 points from 1977–78 until 1988–89.  Anderson was beginning to establish himself during his third season in Toronto when the club made a four-player trade with the Vancouver Canucks that brought winger Rick Vaive and centre Bill Derlago to Toronto.  Anderson was paired with the two new acquisitions to form a high scoring line for the Maple Leafs. His best statistical season was the 1982–83 season, when he set career highs with 49 assists and 80 points. Following the 1984–85 season, the fourth year in a row that Anderson had scored 30-or-more goals for the Maple Leafs, he was traded to the Quebec Nordiques for defensemen Brad Maxwell.

Anderson continued to be a valued goal scorer with Quebec and had scored 21 goals when he was traded to the Hartford Whalers. Anderson then ended the 1985–86 season in Hartford with 25 points in 14 games following the trade, finishing the season with 29 goals and 74 points before scoring another 13 points in ten playoff games. The following year, his first full year with Hartford, Whalers sniper Sylvain Turgeon battled injuries and Anderson filled in as the top left wing on the team. He hit the 30-goal plateau for the fifth and final time of his career finishing with 31 goals and 75 points, good for the third highest point total on the team. Anderson scored the winning goal against the New York Rangers on April 4, 1987, to give the Hartford Whalers their only division championship. He played two more years in Hartford before playing the last five seasons of his career in the minor leagues, primarily the International Hockey League, where he was a solid goal scorer.

Post-playing career

Anderson coached the 1995–96 Winston-Salem Mammoths to the Southern Hockey League finals during the league's only season where they lost to the Huntsville Channel Cats. In 1996–97, Anderson coached the Quad City Mallards to their first Colonial Hockey League championship in the franchise's second season.

In 1997, Anderson was hired as the head coach of the Chicago Wolves in the International Hockey League (IHL) and later in the American Hockey League (AHL). He became the Wolves' all-time coaching leader in wins with 371 and for postseason victories with 80. Anderson led the Wolves in winning the Turner Cup and Calder Cup four times in his initial eleven seasons at the team's helm. His team was crowned league champions in 1998, 2000 in the IHL and 2002 and 2008 in the AHL. Anderson coached the American gold medal-winning team in the 2007 Jewish World Cup hockey tournament in Israel.

On June 20, 2008, Anderson was named as the fourth head coach of the Atlanta Thrashers. On October 10, 2008, Anderson won his first game as an NHL coach 7–4 against his good friend Bruce Boudreau's Washington Capitals. On April 14, 2010, Anderson was released as head coach of the Thrashers after two seasons.

On July 12, 2011, Anderson became an assistant coach for the Phoenix Coyotes. On July 10, 2013, Anderson was rehired as the head coach of the Chicago Wolves. After leaving the Wolves in 2016, he joined the Minnesota Wild as an assistant head coach until 2018. In February 2022, he agreed to join the Bakersfield Condors of the AHL as an assistant coach for the remainder of the 2021–22 season.

For his achievements with coaching the Wolves, he was named to the AHL Hall of Fame in 2019.

Anderson also helped establish John Anderson's, a diner best known for its "Banquet Burger", as well as its $4 breakfast special. The original restaurant is located at Victoria Park Ave. and Van Horne Ave. in Toronto, Ontario.

Career statistics

Regular season and playoffs

International

NHL coaching statistics

References

External links

 

1957 births
Arizona Coyotes coaches
Atlanta Thrashers coaches
Binghamton Whalers players
Canadian expatriate ice hockey players in Italy
Canadian expatriate ice hockey players in the United States
Canadian ice hockey coaches
Canadian ice hockey right wingers
Canadian people of Scottish descent
Chicago Wolves coaches
ECH Chur players
Dallas Black Hawks players
Fort Wayne Komets players
Hartford Whalers players
HC Milano players
Ice hockey people from Toronto
Living people
Minnesota Wild coaches
National Hockey League first-round draft picks
New Haven Nighthawks players
Quebec Nordiques (WHA) draft picks
Quebec Nordiques players
San Diego Gulls (IHL) players
Toronto Maple Leafs draft picks
Toronto Maple Leafs players
Toronto Marlboros players